The Welshpool Jetty railway was a  narrow gauge branch line in Victoria, Australia. It opened on 26 June 1905, and was operated as a horse-drawn tramway, connecting Welshpool station to Port Welshpool. It had a total length of just under  and ran to the old fishing jetty. The line closed on 1 January 1941.

See also
 Narrow gauge lines of the Victorian Railways

References 

2 ft 6 in gauge railways in Australia
Closed regional railway lines in Victoria (Australia)
Transport in Gippsland (region)